Voom HD was a television channel providing high-definition programming from various genres. The network was available in 35 countries in Europe and Asia.

Programming was taken from the various stations owned by Voom HD Networks in the United States and includes Full Frontal Fashion, Earth Diaries and Gamespotting.

A deal between Rainbow Networks and the Stockholm-based company NonStop Television was made in 2006 that allowed NonStop to distribute the channel in Scandinavia, Finland, Iceland and the Baltic states. The channel was launched in Sweden by satellite distributor Canal Digital on November 1. This was soon followed by launched in Denmark, Norway, Finland, Estonia and Latvia on various providers. The channel was managed by Scandinavian television broadcaster NonStop Television, part of Turner Broadcasting.

In much of the rest of Europe, Africa, the Middle East and parts of Asia the channel was represented by Zonemedia. In April 2007, they launched the channel in the Arab World via the Orbit platform.

Voom HD closed down in Europe on August 31, 2009. In many countries it was replaced by Rush HD. This was the case on the Canal Digital platform, UPC Austria and in the Czech Republic.

References

Direct broadcast satellite services
Television stations in Denmark
Television channels and stations established in 2006
Television channels and stations disestablished in 2009